Ernest Thokozani Myeni (born 15 June 1968) is a South African politician who was elected to the National Assembly of South Africa in the 2019 general election as a member of the African National Congress.

Background
Myeni was born on 15 June 1968. He has matric and holds a diploma in business management.

Myeni served as a regional treasurer for the African National Congress.

Parliament
Myeni stood for election to the South African National Assembly  in the 2019 election as a candidate on the ANC's KwaZulu-Natal regional to national list. He was elected and sworn into office on 22 May 2019.

On 27 June 2019, Myeni was assigned to serve on the National Assembly's  Portfolio Committee on Small Business Development.

References

External links

Living people
1968 births
Zulu people
People from KwaZulu-Natal
African National Congress politicians
Members of the National Assembly of South Africa
21st-century South African politicians